Pliohyrax, is a genus of hyracoids (the cavy-like group of animals most closely related to elephants and manatees). It grew to sizes greatly exceeding those of any living hyrax, though it was by no means the largest member of this family.

 
Fossils of this Miocene-Pliocene, scansorial herbivore have been found in Afghanistan, France, and Turkey.
In Spain, Pliohyrax graecus is among the large mammals species found in the Almenara site, deposited during the Messinian salinity crisis, together with Macaca sp., Bovidae indet., cf. Nyctereutes sp., and Felidae indet.

References

Prehistoric hyraxes
Pliocene mammals of Europe
Pliocene mammals of Asia
Miocene mammals of Europe
Miocene mammals of Asia
Pliocene extinctions
Prehistoric placental genera
Taxa named by Henry Fairfield Osborn
Fossil taxa described in 1899